Brent Colin Sutter (born June 10, 1962) is a Canadian former National Hockey League (NHL) player and former head coach of the New Jersey Devils and Calgary Flames. Selected by the New York Islanders 17th overall at the 1980 NHL Entry Draft, Sutter played over 1,000 games for the Islanders and Chicago Blackhawks during his 18-year career. Regarded as one of the best face-off specialists of his generation, Sutter won the Stanley Cup twice with the Islanders and was an All-Star. He represented Canada on numerous occasions, winning the Canada Cup three times.

After retiring as a player in 1998, Sutter bought the Red Deer Rebels of the Western Hockey League and served as the team's head coach and general manager for eight seasons, winning the Memorial Cup in 2001. He coached the Canadian junior team to gold medals at the 2005 and 2006 World Junior Hockey Championships, as well as winning the 2007 Super Series. Sutter compiled a 19–0–1 record in three years as the national junior team coach. He joined the New Jersey Devils as their head coach in 2007. He led the Devils to one division title in two seasons before leaving New Jersey to take on the same position in Calgary, working for brother Darryl, who was at the time, the Flames' general manager.

He is a member of the famous Sutter family. He was one of six brothers, along with Brian, Darryl, Duane, Ron, and Rich, to play in the NHL. Brent and Duane played together for the Islanders when the team won the Stanley Cup in 1982 and 1983. Brent coached his son Brandon and nephew Brett while with Red Deer; both have also gone on to play in the NHL. His daughter Brooke played volleyball for Red Deer College and was a first team conference all star in 2013.

Career

Playing career

Sutter played for the New York Islanders and the Chicago Blackhawks in the NHL, finishing with 829 points (363 goals, 466 assists) in 1111 regular season games and 74 points (30 goals, 44 assists) in 144 playoff games.

In the 1980 NHL Entry Draft Sutter was the Islanders' first pick, 17th overall. His tenure with the Islanders lasted between 1981 and 1991 and with much early success. Sutter would have the fortune of being on a team that entered the Stanley Cup finals in his first three seasons, winning in his first two. Sutter was named captain of the Islanders in 1987, when Denis Potvin relinquished the role.

In 1991, he was traded to the Chicago Blackhawks with Brad Lauer for Adam Creighton and Steve Thomas. He spent the last seven years of his NHL career in Chicago. During part of his time with the 'Hawks he was coached by his older brother Darryl. Brent was the last active player in the NHL that had played with the Islanders during their early 1980s dynasty, as well as the last member of the team still with the Islanders when he was traded to the Chicago Blackhawks in 1991. In 1991–92, he helped lead the Hawks to a Stanley Cup final appearance, thus playing in four Cup finals in his career.

Coaching career
Sutter coached the Canadian junior ice hockey teams to consecutive gold medals at the 2005 World Junior Ice Hockey Championships and 2006 World Junior Ice Hockey Championships. He led both teams to unbeaten records, becoming the first coach to lead Canada to consecutive gold medals. Sutter declined Hockey Canada's offer to return for a third time in 2007. During the eight-game 2007 Super Series, Sutter extended his junior coaching unbeaten record to 20 straight games - 19 of them wins - behind the Canadian bench in international junior play.

Sutter was also the head coach and GM of the Red Deer Rebels of the WHL for eight seasons from 1999 to 2007, leading them to a finals appearance as well as two 50 win seasons.

Sutter resigned as head coach and GM of the Rebels on July 12, 2007 as he reached an agreement to become the next coach of the New Jersey Devils. The following day, Sutter was introduced as head coach of the New Jersey Devils. In the 2007–08 season, Sutter led the Devils to a 46 win season and a playoff berth. The following season, Sutter enjoyed his best season as a head coach, leading the Devils to a franchise best, 51 win season as well as an Atlantic Division title. After a first round playoff exit from the Carolina Hurricanes, Sutter stepped down as coach of the team on June 9, 2009, citing family reasons. However, two weeks later on June 23, Sutter was named head coach of the Calgary Flames by his brother Darryl Sutter, the Flames' general manager. This decision sparked controversy and anger from many Devils fans, players, and front office officials. Devils owner Jeff Vanderbeek was openly critical of the decision for Sutter to step down and later sign to coach another team.

On April 12, 2012, he was not offered a new contract by the Calgary Flames.  In November 2012, Sutter again took the reins of the Red Deer Rebels, where he also serves as General Manager.

Sutter family in hockey

The Sutter family, originally from Viking, Alberta, Canada, is one of the most famous families in the National Hockey League (NHL). Six brothers: Brian, Darryl, Duane, Brent, Rich and Ron, reached the NHL in the 1970s and 80s. Four brothers: Brian, Duane, Darryl and Brent have gone on to become coaches and general managers as well. A seventh brother named Gary is said by his brothers to have been the best hockey player of all seven boys. Rather than making his living as a hockey player, Gary stayed home to work on the family farm, as Rich Sutter remarked on an episode of the Canadian sports show Off the Record.

Collectively, the six Sutter brothers played over 5000 games and captured six Stanley Cups. The second generation of Sutters are beginning to reach the NHL, as Brandon Sutter is now a member of the Vancouver Canucks. Brett Sutter who had played 18 games with the Flames' was traded to the Hurricanes on November 17, 2010 and has been called up by the Hurricanes, but is mainly a member of the Charlotte Checkers, the Hurricanes AHL affiliate.

Sutter and his wife Connie have three children, sons Merrick and Brandon, and daughter Brooke.

Career statistics

Regular season and playoffs

International

Coaching career

NHL 
Regular season and playoffs

Junior leagues 
Regular season and playoffs

International

See also
Captain (ice hockey)
Notable families in the NHL
List of NHL players with 1000 games played

References

External links

1962 births
Living people
Calgary Flames coaches
Canada men's national ice hockey team coaches
Canadian ice hockey centres
Chicago Blackhawks players
Ice hockey people from Alberta
Lethbridge Broncos players
National Hockey League first-round draft picks
New Jersey Devils coaches
New York Islanders draft picks
New York Islanders players
People from Beaver County, Alberta
Red Deer Rebels coaches
Red Deer Rustlers players
Stanley Cup champions
Brent
Canadian ice hockey coaches